Nibret Melak Bogale (born 9 October 1999) is an Ethiopian long-distance runner.

He won the Cinque Mulini in 2021, the second leg of the World Athletics Cross Country Permit series completing a double for Ethiopia with Tsehay Gemechu winning the women's race. It was Melak's second consecutive podium finish in the Cross Country Permit series, following his runner-up spot at the Campaccio in San Giorgio su Legnano the previous week. Earlier in the year he successfully defended his senior men's title at the Jan Meda International Cross Country, which doubles as the Ethiopian Championships. Two weeks prior, he had beaten two-time world champion Muktar Edris over 5000m in Addis Ababa.

In June 21 he shaved 13 seconds off his personal best in the 5000m going from 13:07.27 to 12:54.22 as he finished second in the Ethiopian Olympic trials behind Getnet Wale and ahead of Milkesa Mengesha to secure his place at the delayed 2020 Tokyo Olympics.

References

1999 births
Living people
Ethiopian male long-distance runners
Athletes (track and field) at the 2020 Summer Olympics
Olympic athletes of Ethiopia
21st-century Ethiopian people